Panamerican records in the sport of track cycling are ratified by the Confederación Panamericana de Ciclismo (COPACI).

Men

Women

* In 2013, the 3000m team pursuit, 3 rider format was replaced by the UCI with a 4000m team pursuit, 4 person format.

References

External links
COPACI official web site
Panamerican Championships and Panamerican Games Track Cycling records

Cycle racing in North America
Cycle racing in South America
Track cycling records
Cycling, track